"The Square Triangle" is the tenth episode aired of the first series of UFO - a 1970 British television science fiction series about an alien invasion of Earth. The screenplay was written by Alan Pattillo and the director was David Lane. The episode was filmed between 3 September and 15 September 1969 and aired on the ATV Midlands on 9 December 1970. Though shown as the ninth episode, it was actually the eleventh to have been filmed.

The series was created by Gerry Anderson and Sylvia Anderson with Reg Hill, and produced by the Andersons and Lew Grade's Century 21 Productions for Grade's ITC Entertainment company.

Story
Straker allows a UFO to land in Southern England in an attempt to capture the craft, and its alien crew, by sending out a fleet of SHADO mobiles.  After the UFO lands safely, a lone alien survivor has a fight with a game warden and his dog, causing the alien's uniform to rip and his helmet to shatter.  The alien kills the human with a machine gun-style weapon, drags the corpse to the UFO, and then self-destructs the craft in an attempt to get away by substituting the human with himself.  Colonel Foster and his crew identify the charred corpse as the human and not the alien; moreover, they find a piece of the aliens uniform and use the surviving canine to track his location within the surrounding woodlands.  Meantime, in a cottage close to the landing site, Liz Newton is conspiring with her lover Cass Fowler to murder Liz's husband, Jack.  Liz plans to shoot Jack upon his arrival at home and then claim that she thought him to be an intruder.  To that end Cass coaches her in the details of her alibi and it's made clear that he is the driving force in the plan.  However, their scheme is foiled when the alien suddenly appears at the front door and is shot instead.

Foster and his investigation team arrive with the dog to find the dead alien, from which the conniving pair are taken to SHADO headquarters, where they are debriefed of the events, and eventually given an amnesia drug to make them forget everything that had occurred within the previous twelve hours.

Meanwhile Foster continues the investigation at the cottage.  When Jack returns, Foster questions him to deduce the couple's murderous plan.  At SHADO, Foster explains a theory that the pair originally planned to kill the husband and if released, there was no stopping them from doing it again.  Straker points out that they cannot provide the body of an alien or turn over the pair to the authorities because SHADO is not in the "moralizing business", from which Straker orders Foster to get everything possible about the destroy UFO, and Colonel Freeman to check on the autopsy of the alien.  The pair are released.  The final shot shows Liz in the near future looking at a non-identifying gravestone during the end credits with a far shot of an approaching male that appears to be Cass.  RE:

Released as episode 10, it actually is episode 11 according order of production

Cast

Starring
 Ed Bishop — Commander Edward Straker
 George Sewell — Col. Alec E. Freeman
 Michael Billington — Col. Paul Foster
 Gabrielle Drake — Lt. Gay Ellis
 Dolores Mantez — Lt. Nina Barry
 Gary Myers — Capt. Lew Waterman
 Keith Alexander — Lt. Keith Ford
 Ayshea — Lt. Ayshea Johnson
 Norma Ronald — Miss Ealand

Also starring
 Adrienne Corri — Liz Newton

Featuring
 Patrick Mower — Cass Fowler	
 Allan Cuthbertson — Jack Newton	
 Anthony Chinn — Alien	
 Godfrey James — Mitchell, game warden 
 Hugo Panczak — Navigator in SHADO mobile

Production notes
Anthony Chinn is one of 11 actors to appear in both Doppelgänger and the UFO series. This was also his second episode having previously appeared as an officer on Skydiver in Sub-Smash.

Locations included Black Park and Black Park Cottage in Iver Heath, Buckinghamshire.

References

External links

1970 British television episodes
UFO (TV series) episodes